There have been 9 women in the National Parliament of Papua New Guinea since the independence of Papua New Guinea in 1975.  

As of 1 February 2019, Papua New Guinea was one of only three countries in the world out of 235 that had no women in its legislative branch or parliament. In the 2017 national election, 165 women ran for parliament out of a total of 3,000 candidates, or five percent. No women were elected, including the three female incumbents. However, in the July 2022 national election, for 118 members of parliament, two were elected.

References

National Parliament of Papua New Guinea
Papua New Guinea